St. Agnes Catholic Church is a Roman Catholic church at 203 Eighth Street in Mena, Arkansas.  The parish, established not long after Mena's founding in 1896, meets in a stone Spanish Mission Revival built in 1921–22 to a design by Rev. A. P. Gallagher, who oversaw the parish for more than 50 years.  It is one of Polk County's most significant architectural statements, merging the common use of local fieldstone with more sophistical Mission style elements.  The church was listed on the National Register of Historic Places in 1991.

See also
National Register of Historic Places listings in Polk County, Arkansas

References

Churches on the National Register of Historic Places in Arkansas
Mission Revival architecture in Arkansas
Buildings and structures in Polk County, Arkansas
National Register of Historic Places in Polk County, Arkansas